Kamskiye Polyany (Qama Alanı) is an urban locality (an urban-type settlement) in Nizhnekamsky District of the Republic of Tatarstan, Russia, located on the left bank of the Kama River,  southwest of Nizhnekamsk, the administrative center of the district. As of the 2010 Census, its population was 15,795.

History
It was established in the 18th century as the selo of Polyanki. Due to the construction of the now abandoned Tatar Nuclear Power Station, it was granted urban-type settlement status in 1982.

Administrative and municipal status
Within the framework of administrative divisions, the urban-type settlement of Kamskiye Polyany is subordinated to Nizhnekamsky District. As a municipal division, Kamskiye Polyany is incorporated within Nizhnekamsky Municipal District as Kamskiye Polyany Urban Settlement.

Economy
As of 1997, there were several machine building plants in Kamskiye Polyany, as well as a garment factory, a knitting factory, and a construction panel factory.

Demographics

As of 1989, the population was mostly Russian (52.3%), Tatar (37.9%), Chuvash (3.7%), Ukrainian (1.7%), and Bashkir (1.1%).

References

Notes

Sources

Urban-type settlements in the Republic of Tatarstan
Monotowns in Russia
Populated places on the Kama River
Chistopolsky Uyezd